Stavros Sarafis (17 January 1950 – 13 October 2022) was a Greek football player who spent his entire career in PAOK, playing as an attacking midfielder or forward. He was one of the club's most famous players and also the all-time top scorer. His nickname was "Ceasar".

Career
Sarafis was born in Epanomi, on the outskirts of Thessaloniki in 1950. He was discovered by president Giorgos Pantelakis, joined PAOK in 1967, and remained with the club for 14 years, retiring in 1981. He was a prolific goalscorer, netting 136 goals in 358 league matches with PAOK. He also scored 26 goals in the Greek Cup and 8 in UEFA competitions, for 170 goals in total. His partnership with Giorgos Koudas was one of the most prolific attacking duos in Greek football during the 1970s, winning one league championship and two cups. After retiring, he continued working for the club in various positions, including assistant manager.

Sarafis played 32 games for the Greece national team between 1969 and 1977, scoring 7 goals.

Death
Sarafis died on 13 October 2022, at the age of 72.

Honours
PAOK
Alpha Ethniki: 1975–76
Greek Cup: 1971–72, 1973–74

See also
List of one-club men in association football

References

1950 births
2022 deaths
People from Thessaloniki (regional unit)
Greek footballers
Footballers from Central Macedonia
Greece international footballers
Association football forwards
Association football midfielders
Super League Greece players
PAOK FC players
Greek football managers
PAOK FC managers
PAOK FC non-playing staff